Jacob Gildor (born in 1948) is an Israeli artist,  representative of the Surrealist movement in Israeli art and of the group of "Second Generation" of Holocaust survivors artists. He is a professional art advisor and consultant at Montefiore Auction House, Tel Aviv and MacDougall's Fine Art Auctions, London. Gildor resides, works, and creates in Tel Aviv.

Biography
Jacob-Yosef Gildengorin was born in the German town of Feuchtwangen. His parents were Holocaust survivors who met after the war.  Both were the sole survivors of their families.  In 1948 the Gildengorin family immigrated to Israel after the birth of their first son, Jacob. They initially settled in Tel Aviv and later on moved to Holon. A year later, his brother, Michael, was born. The children were given a secular education and were raised in a house where work and education were of the highest priorities. The parents' horrific past no longer existed, and it was never discussed in the presence of the children. Nevertheless, in the daily routine there were many references to their being second generation Holocaust survivors.

The family moved to the center of Holon and later bought a café in Tel Aviv, "Café Atara". A few years later they invested in a café and bakery on Yefet Street in Jaffa which was considered at that time an area of crime, drugs, and prostitution. It was in this café that Jacob started his drawing and painting career.

In 1962, at the age of 14, Jaffa's colorful characters sitting in his father's café were his inspiration. Jacob completed his high school education at the age of 17 and had one year left before military enrollment. He applied to the Bezalel Academy of Art in Jerusalem and was accepted and placed in the second year. However, deciding to take a different route, Jacob chose to start law studies in Tel Aviv University. He continued his studies while serving as a combat paramedic in 669, the IDF's Airborne Rescue and Evacuation Unit. He finished his law studies at 1971 and worked as a lawyer for 14 years in "Ha'Sneh" company.

The turning point arrived at the age of 40 when he retired from his work and decided to devote his time to art.  His first solo exhibition of paper work, drawings, and monotypes was held in 1968 in Bet Hachayal in Tel Aviv under the patronage of the IDF's Chief Education Officer.

In 1971 Gildor was invited by the Surrealist artist and teacher Prof. Ernst Fuchs, to Riechenau, a quiet Austrian town in the foothills of the Alps, to learn the master's unique technique in tempera. A close friendship was made between the teacher and student which opened the young artist to the Surrealist movement.

In 1987 Gildor spent a year in Cite des Arts in Paris under an Israeli scholarship.

Throughout the years Gildor exhibited in many galleries in Israel, Sweden, Germany and France.

In 2009, a major comprehensive retrospective exhibition, "Segments of Creation", with Gildor's works throughout four decades, was held in the Museum of Israeli Art in Ramat-Gan, curated by the Museum Director, Meir Aharonson. The exhibition was displayed for six months and accompanied by a three part complete monography.
 
Gildor is married to Hava Zeilingold. The couple has three sons: Guy (C.E.O. of Persway, a high tech company from Herzliya), Ofer (Gilden's Art Gallery in London) and Boaz (Ph.D. in biology, from Weizmann Institute of Science, in Rehovot).

The "Meshushe" Group 
In 1980, Gildor was one of the founders of Meshushe (Hexagon) group. The group's goal was to introduce Surrealist art to the Israel art space that was dominated  by the abstract and conceptual art movements at the time. The founding group consisted of Gildor and five other surrealists: Baruch Elron, Yoav Shuali, Arie Lamdan, Asher Rodnitzky, and Rachel Timor. The group held 10 exhibitions all around Israel and although they were warmly accepted and admired by the Israeli audience, they never managed to enter the Israeli Canon of Art critiques.

Second Generation 
By being the son of two Holocaust survivors, Gildor belonged to a group frequently called "The Second Generation". The term was coined in the 1980s when children of Holocaust survivors reached the stage of self-awareness and began to shape their identity. Although the "second generation" did not experience the events, the impact can be seen in their work.  Gildor began addressing the issue directly in the 1990s, although hints about the subject can also be found in his earlier work. This topic influenced his art work from 1993 and during the subsequent twenty years.

Selected solo exhibitions 
1968 – Drawings, Bet Ha'Chayal, Tel Aviv
1968 – Drawing and Monotypes, Central Library, Tel Aviv University.
1973 – The Surrealist Portrait, Israel's Gallery, Tel Aviv
1975 – Oil paintings, Graphic 3 Art Gallery, Haifa
1976 – 31 Oil paintings, Rene Darom Gallery, Tel Aviv
1977 – Paintings, Galleri Viktoria, Gotborg, Sweden
1978 – Paintings, Shamir Gallery, Tel Aviv
1979 – Drawings and Woodcuts, Graphic 3 Art Gallery, Haifa
1983 – Woodcuts in Black and White, Artist's House, Jerusalem 
1983 –  Woodcuts – New Album, Tova Osman Gallery, Tel Aviv
1984 – Window Exhibition, Kunsthaus Welker, Heidelberg
1987 – Oil Works and Works on Paper, Cite International des Arts, Paris.
1991 – New Works, RIG Art, Tel Aviv
1997 – Paintings from There, Israeli Art Museum, Ramat Gan
2004 – Backwords and Forwards, Sara Kishon Art Gallery, Tel Aviv
2007 – Etchings and works on paper, Gilden's Art, London
2009 – Segments of Creation – Retrospective exhibition, Israeli Art Museum, Ramat Gan
2013 – Targets, Montefiore Auction House and Gallery, Tel Aviv
2014 – Collages, Gilden's Art, London

Selected group shows 
1968 – Art Week, Tel Aviv
1972 – Autom Show, Mabat Gallery, Tel Aviv
1980–1986 – 10 group exhibition of the Meshushe Group
1982 – The 6th Bianalle, Modern Art Museum, Haifa
1985 – The Bianalle of young artists, New Art Museum, Haifa
1986 – 5 Artists, City Gallery, Ramat Gan
1986 – Woodcut in Israel, Jerusalem
1992 – Hommage at the Cité Internationale des Arts, Artist's House, Jerusalem
1997 – 50 Blue and White, Art Hall, Holon
2003 – Fruits in Israeli Art, Bar David Museum, Baram
2004 – Meshushe Group, Sara Kishn Gallery, Tel Aviv
2008 – Layers of Memory, Artist's House, Tel Aviv
2009 – 30 years to the Tova Osman Gallery

Participated regularly at international important art fairs around the world: Frankfurt, Düsseldorf, Karlsruhe, London, Budapest, New York City, Los Angeles, Hong Kong.

Further reading 
 Gazit, 385–390, L"G, pp. 47–48, 1976 
 Rachel Angel, Meshushe against Tel Chai, Maariv, 20.9.1981
 Gideon Ofrat, Between Woe and Womb, Museum Catalog, Ramat Gan, 1995
 Gideon Ofrat, Jacob Gildor – Exhibition II, Studio Magazin, 1.9.1996
 Jacob Gildor – A monography in three parts, Israeli Art Museum, Ramat Gan with contributuin of Gilden's Art, London, 2009
 Eli Armon Azulay, Jacob Gildor's Studio Visit, Achbar Ha'ir, 25 December 2009

Picture gallery 

1948 births
Living people
Jewish painters
Israeli surrealist artists
Israeli painters
People from Ansbach (district)
People from Holon
Tel Aviv University alumni